Bankhedi railway station is a railway station in Narmadapuram district of Madhya Pradesh. Its code is BKH. It serves Bankhedi town. The station consists of two platforms. Passenger, Express and Superfast trains halt here.

References

Railway stations in Narmadapuram district
Jabalpur railway division